Kahla (also Romanized as Kahlā; also known as Kāhīla) is a village in, and the capital of, Bizineh Rud Rural District of Bizineh Rud District of Khodabandeh County, Zanjan province, Iran. At the 2006 National Census, its population was 1,661 in 406 households. The following census in 2011 counted 1,900 people in 525 households. The latest census in 2016 showed a population of 1,947 people in 564 households.

References 

Khodabandeh County

Populated places in Zanjan Province

Populated places in Khodabandeh County